Northgate House is a grade II* listed building at 19 London Road in the city of Gloucester, England. It was built in the mid to late 17th-century and refronted in the mid 18th-century.

References

External links 

Grade II* listed houses
Grade II* listed buildings in Gloucestershire
Houses in Gloucestershire
Buildings and structures in Gloucester